Laura Lee Helmuth is an American science journalist and the editor in chief of Scientific American. She was formerly the Health and Science editor at The Washington Post. From 2016 to 2018, she served as the president of the National Association of Science Writers.

Education and early career 
Helmuth attended Eckerd College, where she received her Bachelor of Science in biology and psychology in 1991. She then attended the University of California, Berkeley, where she received her PhD in cognitive neuroscience in 1997. She performed her doctoral work in the laboratory of Richard Ivry. Her research centered on the underlying neuroscience of Parkinson's disease and contributed to the thesis Sequence Learning in Patients with Parkinson's Disease. Her research included  the role of the cerebellum in verbal function, learning, and attention, as well as studying how the brain coordinates and executes cyclic movements.

In 1998, she earned a certificate in science communication from University of California, Santa Cruz. She began her science-writing career as an intern at Science News.

Writer and editor 
Helmuth began her writing career as a staff reporter and editor for Science magazine, from 1999 to 2004. She then became a Science Editor at Smithsonian Magazine, where she remained from 2004 to 2012 before becoming the Science and Health editor at the online magazine Slate. On April 28, 2016, Helmuth was appointed The Washington Post's editor of Health, Science and Environment, where she initiated a Post series called "Medical Mysteries."

On April 13, 2020, Helmuth became the ninth overall editor-in-chief of Scientific American, succeeding Mariette DiChristina.

Helmuth has written about and lectured on combatting "misinformation through science journalism." She has stated that, in science journalism, it has started to be recognized that "there are not always two sides to every story." She offered the example of evolution, in relation to which she said, "we don’t quote creationists,” while she added that “with climate change, you can disagree about what to do about [it], but the science of it is completely, comprehensively proven.” While at the Washington Post, she oversaw the development of a video series called "The Vaccine Project," written by Anna Rothschild and Brian Monroe, to address vaccine hesitancy.

After the coronovirus pandemic broke, Hellmuth developed, in 2020, a tip sheet for journalists covering the pandemic, noting that "repetition makes misinformation feel more true."

Presidential endorsement
In September 2020, Scientific American announced its endorsement of Senator Joe Biden for the 2020 presidential election, breaking, as the media noted, a 175-year tradition of never having endorsed a presidential candidate.
 Interviewed by NPR, Helmuth stated that the editorial decision was "both unanimous and quick." She added that the magazine needs "to tell what we know about the consequences the Trump administration has had for science, health, the environment, for using evidence, for really understanding and accepting reality," and to "show that this time the choice is just so important for science."

Appointments and service 
Helmuth serves as a member of the National Academies of Sciences, Engineering, and Medicine's Standing Committee on the project for Advancing Science Communication Research and Practice. She has also given lectures at institutions like the American Institute of Physics, the National Academy of Sciences, and the University of Wisconsin–Madison about how science journalists can counter misinformation and address uncertainty in their reporting.

From 2017 to 2018, Helmuth served as president of the National Association of Science Writers. She has also served as a board member for the Society for Science and the Public, and the American Association for the Advancement of Science's SciLine service which connects scientists and journalists.

Bibliography

Articles

Awards and honors 
 Distinguished Graduate Student Alumni Award, University of California, Santa Cruz, 2019
 Writer in Residence, University of Wisconsin–Madison, 2018

Notes

References 

Year of birth missing (living people)
Living people
21st-century American women writers
American science journalists
American women journalists
Eckerd College alumni
Scientific American people
University of California, Berkeley alumni
The Washington Post journalists
21st-century American journalists
American magazine editors
American women editors
Women magazine editors